Gentarō (源太郎) is a Japanese male personal name, and may refer to:

, Imperial Japanese Army general and Meiji era government official
, Imperial Japanese Navy admiral
, Japanese business executive
, Japanese actor and voice actor
, Japanese professional wrestler

Japanese masculine given names